Vince Lia (born 18 March 1985) is an Australian professional football (soccer) player who plays for Altona Magic in the National Premier Leagues Victoria.

Born in Shepparton, Lia played youth football in Victoria before making his senior debut with South Melbourne in the National Soccer League. He spent one season with Fawkner-Whittlesea Blues in 2005 before joining Melbourne Victory in 2005 to play in the newly-formed A-League. Lia next spent a decade at Wellington Phoenix, making over 200 appearances for the club in all competitions. He returned to Australia in 2017, signing with Adelaide United. He had a brief spell at Perth Glory in 2020.

Lia represented Australia numerous times at youth level, including at the 2003 FIFA U-20 World Cup and 2005 FIFA U-20 World Cup.

Club career

Melbourne Victory
Lia spent the early stages of his professional career in the NSL at South Melbourne. He then moved on to Melbourne Victory where he spent two years as a fringe player, albeit winning a championship.

Wellington Phoenix
Lia moved to the Wellington Phoenix in 2007. Lia scored his first ever A-League goal in a 1–1 draw against his former club, Melbourne Victory, in the 58th minute on 24 November 2007.
Lia missed the entire 2008–09 A-League Season due to a knee injury suffered in pre-season, requiring a full reconstruction. On 20 October 2009, Lia extended his contract with the Wellington Phoenix until the end of 2012.

Adelaide United
After a successful trial, Lia was given a one year deal with Adelaide United for the 2017–18 season. He made his A-League debut for the club on 13 October 2017 in a 2–1 win over Brisbane Roar. A week later, Lia scored both goals for Adelaide in a 2–2 draw against Melbourne Victory, his former club.

Perth Glory
Following a number of injuries to Perth Glory's defence, the club signed Lia for the remainder of the 2019–20 A-League season. Lia was released by Perth Glory at the end of the 2019–20 A-League.

Altona Magic
In February 2021, Lia joined Altona Magic.

International career
Lia captained the Australian U-20's at the 2005 FIFA World Youth Championship.

Career statistics

Honours

Club
Melbourne Victory
 A-League Championship: 2006–07
 A-League Premiership: 2006–07

Adelaide United
 FFA Cup: 2018, 2019

International
Australia
 OFC U-20 Championship: 2002, 2005

References

External links
 Aussie Footballers Lawrie to Lia
 

1985 births
Living people
People from Shepparton
Australian people of Italian descent
Australian soccer players
Expatriate association footballers in New Zealand
A-League Men players
National Soccer League (Australia) players
Melbourne Victory FC players
South Melbourne FC players
Wellington Phoenix FC players
Adelaide United FC players
Perth Glory FC players
Altona Magic SC players
Australian people of Chinese descent
Association football midfielders